The State Assembly of the Mari El Republic is the regional parliament of Mari El, a federal subject of Russia. A total of 52 deputies are elected for five-year terms. 26 deputies are elected by single-member constituencies and another 26 are elected in party lists.

The State Assembly approves ministers, who are nominated by the republic's President.

The presiding officer is the Chairman of the State Assembly.

Elections

2019

List of chairmen

Supreme Council

State Assembly

References

Politics of Mari El
Mari El Republic
Mari El